Jeff Nelson (born 1962 in South Africa) is an American drummer and graphic designer. He is best known as the drummer for the Washington, D.C. hardcore punk band Minor Threat.

Biography

Nelson met Ian MacKaye in high school and the two saw their first punk rock show, The Cramps, together. Soon after, they formed their first band, The Slinkees. After playing one show, a lineup change caused them to rename the band The Teen Idles.

He also co-founded the independent record label Dischord Records along with MacKaye in 1980, whose first record was the Teen Idles.  They continue to run Dischord together. The duo also comprised the projects Skewbald/Grand Union and Egg Hunt; both bands recorded only one single.

Nelson has also played in the bands Feedbag, Three, Wonderama, Senator Flux, High Back Chairs, and Fast Piece of Furniture. He founded Pedestrian Press in 1988 and Adult Swim Records in 1989. An aficionado and collector of Jeep Wagoneers and Victorian architecture, Nelson currently lives in the historic "Old West End" of Toledo, Ohio.  In 2008 he formed a community organization called Save Our Scott, which led the fight to save Toledo's oldest high school, built in 1912.  (Jessup W. Scott High School was saved, and underwent a $42 million renovation).

References

Bibliography

External links
 Dischord Records
 Adult Swim Records

1962 births
Living people
People from Washington, D.C.
American punk rock drummers
American male drummers
Woodrow Wilson High School (Washington, D.C.) alumni
Minor Threat members
20th-century American drummers
Skewbald/Grand Union members
20th-century American male musicians